Gnathophylleptum is a genus of shrimps belonging to the family Palaemonidae.

The species of this genus are found in Central America, Southeastern Asia and Australia.

Species:

Gnathophylloides mineri 
Gnathophylloides robustus

References

Palaemonidae